The men's 3000 metres event at the 2003 IAAF World Indoor Championships was held on March 14–16.

Medalists

Results

Heats
First 4 of each heat (Q) and next 4 fastest (q) qualified for the semifinals.

Final

References
Results

3000
3000 metres at the World Athletics Indoor Championships